West Virginia Route 55 is an east–west state highway in West Virginia. The western terminus of the route is at U.S. Route 19 in Muddlety. The eastern terminus is at the Virginia state line six miles (10 km) east of Wardensville, where WV 55 continues as Virginia State Route 55. From Moorefield to the Virginia state line, WV 55 is concurrent with U.S. Route 48. This portion includes the Clifford Hollow Bridge.

Major intersections

References

055
Transportation in Nicholas County, West Virginia
Transportation in Greenbrier County, West Virginia
Transportation in Pocahontas County, West Virginia
Transportation in Randolph County, West Virginia
Transportation in Pendleton County, West Virginia
Transportation in Grant County, West Virginia
Transportation in Hardy County, West Virginia